Alantės Manor is the ruins of a former residential manor in Alantės, Panevėžys district.

References

Manor houses in Lithuania
Neoclassical architecture in Lithuania